Italy competed at the 2018 Winter Paralympics in Pyeongchang, South Korea The delegation was composed by 25 competitors, and won 5 medals (two gold), after the "zero" in Sochi 2014.

Participants
25 in 4 sports, all the athletes are men.

Medalists

Para ice hockey

Italy finished 4th.

Summary

Preliminary round

Semifinal

See also 
 Italy at the Paralympics
 Italy at the 2018 Winter Olympics

References 

2018
2018 in Italian sport
Nations at the 2018 Winter Paralympics